Fella Edmonds also known as Eddie Edmonds (born 1941) was a British child star of film and television.

Life
He was born on 25 October 1941 in Chiswick.

His early promise as Georgie Crain, the principal figure in The Rainbow Jacket failed to land him any further leading roles, other than one in a Children's Film Foundation film (The Stolen Airliner) the following year. Although his small size (and confidence) allowed him to play a jockey he grew up to be 6ft 1.

He had no film roles as an adult.

Known Roles
see

To the Rescue (1952, short)
Paradise Island (1954, TV series) appeared in five out of the six episodes as Don Gurney
The Rainbow Jacket (1954) as Georgie Crain the main character
Whistle for Silence (1954) as boy
Hand in Glove  (1955, TV movie), as Peter
The Stolen Airliner (1955) as Fred
The Right Answers (1955, TV movie), as Christopher Wright
Supersonic Saucer (1956), as Rodney
Calling All Boys (1956, TV series) as Bill

References

Living people
1941 births
English male child actors
English male television actors
People from Chiswick
20th-century English male actors